In geometry, a cochleoid is a snail-shaped curve similar to a strophoid which can be represented by the polar equation

the Cartesian equation

or the parametric equations

The cochleoid is the inverse curve of Hippias' quadratrix.

Notes

References
 
Cochleoid in the Encyclopedia of Mathematics
Liliana Luca, Iulian Popescu: A Special Spiral: The Cochleoid. Fiabilitate si Durabilitate - Fiability & Durability no 1(7)/ 2011, Editura "Academica Brâncuşi" , Târgu Jiu, 
Roscoe Woods: The Cochlioid. The American Mathematical Monthly, Vol. 31, No. 5 (May, 1924), pp. 222–227 (JSTOR)
 Howard Eves: A Graphometer. The Mathematics Teacher, Vol. 41, No. 7 (November 1948), pp. 311-313 (JSTOR)

External links 

cochleoid at 2dcurves.com
 

Plane curves